The men's team pursuit competition at the 2018 Asian Games was held on 27 and 28 August at the Jakarta International Velodrome.

Schedule
All times are Western Indonesia Time (UTC+07:00)

Records

Results
Legend
DNF — Did not finish

Qualifying

First round

Heat 1

Heat 2

Heat 3

Heat 4

Summary

Finals

Bronze

Gold

References

Track Men Team pursuit